Marten-Becker House, also known as Becker House, is a historic home located at St. Charles, St. Charles County, Missouri. It was built about 1865, and is a two-story, "L"-plan, Italianate style brick dwelling. It features a richly bracketed cornice, cupola with arched windows of colored glass and ornate cast iron portico. Also on the property are two contributing brick outbuildings.

It was added to the National Register of Historic Places in 1979.

References

Houses on the National Register of Historic Places in Missouri
Italianate architecture in Missouri
Houses completed in 1865
Buildings and structures in St. Charles County, Missouri
National Register of Historic Places in St. Charles County, Missouri